Belenus is a genus of lace bugs in the family Tingidae. There are about nine described species in Belenus.

Species
These nine species belong to the genus Belenus:
 Belenus adocetus Drake, 1957
 Belenus angulatus Distant, 1909
 Belenus bengalensis Distant, 1909
 Belenus davidii Livingstone, 1972
 Belenus dentatus (Fieber, 1844)
 Belenus eupetes Drake and Ruhoff, 1965
 Belenus laplumei (Schouteden, 1916)
 Belenus parvicollis Linnavuori, 1977
 Belenus thomasi Drake, 1957

References

Further reading

 
 
 
 
 
 
 
 
 
 
 

Tingidae
Articles created by Qbugbot